NCHA Members Hall of Fame was established in 1977 by the National Cutting Horse Association (NCHA) to honor those members who have demonstrated "through their own efforts and those of the horses they raise" over a period time,  their dedication to the sport of cutting, as well as their outstanding and unusual contributions to the NCHA's basic mission in promoting the sport of cutting.  In addition to their Member's Hall of Fame, the NCHA established the following: Non-Pro Hall of Fame, NCHA Rider Hall of Fame, NCHA Horse Hall of Fame, Youth Hall of Fame and Horse of the Year.

Hall of Fame honorees

Dave Batty, Coldstream BC, Canada 
Chris Benedict, Weatherford, TX
Ernie Beutenmiller, Sr, Union, MO 
Bobby Brown, Collierville, TN  
E.C. Bryant, Jr., Weatherford, TX 
Lindy Burch, Weatherford, TX 
Don Bussey, Guin, AL 
Punk Carter, Celina, TX 
Bette Cogdell, Tulia, TX
Carolyn Crist, Fort Worth, TX 
Paul Crumpler, Wichita Falls, TX
Dennie Dunn, Salt Lake City, UT
James Eakin, Hondo, TX 
Jo Ellard, Dallas, TX 
Ben Emison, Weatherford, TX
Jonathan Foote, Livingston, MT 
Dick Gaines, Byers, TX 
Kenneth Galyean, Bentonville, AR 
Lee Garner, Batesville, MS 
Helen K. Groves, Baird, TX 
Leroy Hamann, Belleville, IL 
Rufus Hayes, Milton, FL 
Walter Hellyer, Canada 
Edley Hixson, Jr., DeRidder, LA 
Wayne Hodges, Weatherford, TX 
James Hooper, Decatur, AL 
Pat Jacobs, Burleson, TX
Lisa Johnson, Clayton, NC 
Bob Joy, Cresson, TX
Mike Kelly, Mansfield, TX
Tom Lyons, Grandview, TX
David McGregor, Santa Ynez, CA
Tom McGuane, McLeod, MT
Jim Milner, Southlake, TX
Mary Jo Milner, Southlake, TX
Tommy Moore, Aledo, TX
W.S. "Billy" Morris, III., Augusta, GA
Murlene Mowery, Millsap, TX
Don Neuenschwander, Houston, TX
Jimmy Orrell, Monticello, AR
Harland Radomske, Weatherford, TX
Bill Riddle, Ringling, OK
Terry Riddle, Wynnewood, OK
Dave Robson, Calgary, AB
Mel Shearin, Villa Ridge, MO
Sam Shepard, Verbena, AL
Ray Smith, Mantachie, MS
Don Strain, White River, SD
Terry Strange, Houston, TX
Mance Stark, Merryville, LA
George Stout, Santa Ynez, CA
Chubby Turner, Weatherford, TX
Buster Welch, Rotan, TX
Mike Wells, Houston, TX

Deceased honorees 

S.J. Agnew
Judy Burton Armstrong
Beamon Ashley
Dorris Letcher Ballew
Emry Birdwell 
Grady Blue
Gayle Borland 
Edd Bottom
Norman Bruce 
Robert "Bob" Burton
Stanley Bush
H. Calhoun 
Jim Calhoun
Don Carr
John Carter 
Billy Cogdell
Bill Collins
Bobby Cook 
S.J. "Red" Cook 
J.D. Craft 
Willard Davis
Chester Dennis
Don Dodge
Pat Earnheart 
Dan Evans
Marion Flynt 
J.M. "Shorty" Freeman
J.M. Frost, III. 
George Glascock
Don Gould
Harry J. Guffee 
Ike Hamilton
Mary Harbinson Hensley 
Volney Hildreth
C.P. Honeycutt
Cletus Hulling
Kenneth Jackson
James Kenney
Harold Knox, Sr.
R. C. "Dick" Martin
Byron Matthews
Jack Mehrens
Art Miller
Douglas B. Mitchell
Roger Odum
L.M. "Pat" Patterson
Albert H. Paxton
Louis Pearce Jr.
Jimmy Randals
Jim Reno
Matlock Rose
Tom B. Saunders
Fern Sawyer
Modine Smith
Don Taylor 
Dr. Lamar Thaggard
Larry Townsend
Ray Smyth
Greg Welch
Dale Wilkinson
Philip Williams
Sam Wilson
Zack T. Wood Jr. 
W.H. (Dub) Worrell

References

National Cutting Horse Association
Equestrian museums in the United States
Halls of fame in Texas
Awards established in 1977